New Sweden was a Swedish colony along the lower reaches of the Delaware River in what is now the United States from 1638 to 1655, established during the Thirty Years' War when Sweden was a great military power. New Sweden formed part of the Swedish efforts to colonize the Americas. Settlements were established on both sides of the Delaware Valley in the region of Delaware, New Jersey, Maryland, and Pennsylvania, often in places where Swedish traders had been visiting since about 1610. Fort Christina in Wilmington, Delaware, was the first settlement, named after the reigning Swedish monarch. The settlers were Swedes, Finns, and a number of Dutch. New Sweden was conquered by the Dutch Republic in 1655 during the Second Northern War and incorporated into the Dutch colony of New Netherland.

History

By the middle of the 17th century, the Realm of Sweden had reached its greatest territorial extent and was one of the great powers of Europe; it was the stormaktstiden ("age of greatness" or "great power period"). Sweden then included Finland and Estonia, along with parts of modern Russia, Poland, Germany, and Latvia under King Gustavus Adolphus and later Queen Christina. Other northern European nations were establishing colonies in the New World and building successful trading empires at this time.  The Swedes sought to expand their influence by creating their own plantation (tobacco) and fur-trading colony to circumvent French and English merchants.

The Swedish South Company was founded in 1626 with a mandate to establish colonies between Florida and Newfoundland for the purposes of trade, particularly along the Delaware River. Its charter included Swedish, Dutch, and German stockholders led by directors of the New Sweden Company, including Samuel Blommaert. The company sponsored 11 expeditions in 14 separate voyages to Delaware between 1638 and 1655; two did not survive.

The first Swedish expedition to America sailed from the port of Gothenburg in late 1637, organized and overseen by Clas Larsson Fleming, a Swedish admiral from Finland. Flemish Dutch Samuel Blommaert assisted the fitting-out and appointed Peter Minuit (the former Governor of New Amsterdam) to lead the expedition. The expedition sailed into Delaware Bay aboard the Fogel Grip and Kalmar Nyckel, which lay within the territory claimed by the Dutch. They passed Cape May and Cape Henlopen in late March 1638 and anchored on March 29 at a rocky point on the Minquas Kill that is known today as Swedes' Landing.  They built a fort in Wilmington which they named Fort Christina after their Queen.

In the following years, the area was settled by 600 Swedes and Finns, a number of Dutchmen, a few Germans, a Dane, and at least one Estonian, and Minuit became the first governor of the colony of New Sweden. He had been the third Director of New Amsterdam, and he knew that the Dutch claimed the area south to the Delaware River and its bay. The Dutch, however, had pulled back their settlers from the area after several years in order to concentrate on the settlement on Manhattan Island.

Governor Minuit landed on the west bank of the river and gathered the sachems of the Delawares and Susquehannocks. They held a conclave in Minuit's cabin on the Kalmar Nyckel, and he persuaded them to sign deeds which he had prepared to solve any issue with the Dutch. The Swedes claimed that the purchased land included land on the west side of the South (Delaware) River from just below the Schuylkill River in Philadelphia, southeastern Pennsylvania, Delaware, and coastal Maryland. Delaware sachem Mattahoon later claimed that the purchase only included as much land as was contained within an area marked by "six trees", and the rest of the land occupied by the Swedes was stolen.

Willem Kieft objected to the Swedes landing, but Minuit ignored him since he knew that the Dutch were militarily weak at the moment. Minuit completed Fort Christina in 1638, then sailed for Stockholm to bring the second group of settlers. He made a detour to the Caribbean to pick up a shipment of tobacco to sell in Europe in order to make the voyage profitable. However, he died on this voyage during a hurricane at St. Christopher in the Caribbean. The official duties of the governor of New Sweden were carried out by Captain Måns Nilsson Kling, until a new governor was selected and arrived from Sweden two years later.

The company expanded along the river from Fort Christina under the leadership of Johan Björnsson Printz, governor from 1643 to 1653. They established Fort Nya Elfsborg on the east bank of the Delaware near Salem, New Jersey, and Fort Nya Gothenborg on Tinicum Island to the immediate southwest of Philadelphia. Printz also built his manor house, The Printzhof, at Fort Nya Gothenborg, and the Swedish colony prospered for a time. In 1644, New Sweden supported the Susquehannocks in their war against Maryland colonists. In May 1654, soldiers from New Sweden led by Governor Johan Risingh captured Fort Casimir and renamed it Fort Trinity (Trefaldigheten in Swedish).

Sweden opened the Second Northern War in the Baltic by attacking the Polish–Lithuanian Commonwealth, and the Dutch sent an armed squadron of ships under Director-General Peter Stuyvesant to seize New Sweden. In the summer of 1655, the Dutch marched an army to the Delaware River, easily capturing Fort Trinity and Fort Christina. The Swedish settlement was formally incorporated into Dutch New Netherland on September 15, 1655, although the Swedish and Finnish settlers were allowed local autonomy. They retained their own militia, religion, court, and lands. This lasted until the English conquest of New Netherland, launched on June 24, 1664. The Duke of York sold New Jersey to John Berkeley and George Carteret to become a proprietary colony, separate from the projected colony of New York. The invasion began on August 29, 1664, with the capture of New Amsterdam and ended with the capture of Fort Casimir (New Castle, Delaware) in October. This took place at the beginning of the Second Anglo-Dutch War.

In 1669, New Sweden was under British rule, but most of the population was still Swedish. A man named Marcus Jacobsson, posing as a member of the Königsmarck family, attempted to instigate a rebellion against the British to return New Sweden to Swedish rule. The rebellion, known as the Revolt of the Long Swede due to Jacobsson's height, failed. Jacobsson was sold into slavery in the Caribbean and the families that had supported him were fined for their participation in the revolt.

New Sweden continued to exist unofficially, and some immigration and expansion continued. The first settlement at Wicaco began with a Swedish log blockhouse located on Society Hill in Philadelphia in 1669. It was later used as a church until about 1700, when Gloria Dei (Old Swedes') Church of Philadelphia was built on the site. New Sweden finally came to an end when its land was included in William Penn's charter for Pennsylvania on August 24, 1682.

Hoarkill, New Amstel, and Upland

The start of the Third Anglo-Dutch War resulted in the Dutch recapture of New Netherland in August 1673. They restored the status which predated the English capture, and codified it in the establishment of three counties: Hoarkill County, New Amstel County, and Upland County, which was later partitioned between New Castle County, Delaware, and the Colony of Pennsylvania. The three counties were created on September 12, 1673, the first two on the west shore of the Delaware River and the third on both sides of the river.

The Treaty of Westminster of 1674 ended the second period of Dutch control and required them to return all of New Netherland to the English on June 29, including the three counties which they created. After taking stock, the English declared on November 11 that settlements on the west side of the Delaware River and Delaware Bay were to be dependent on the Province of New York, including the three Counties. This declaration was followed by a declaration that renamed New Amstel as New Castle. The other counties retained their Dutch names.

The next step in the assimilation of New Sweden into New York was the extension of the Duke's laws into the region on September 22, 1676. This was followed by the partition of some Upland Counties to conform to the borders of Pennsylvania and Delaware, with most of the Delaware portion going to New Castle County on November 12, 1678. The remainder of Upland continued in place under the same name. On June 21, 1680, New Castle and Hoarkill Counties were partitioned to produce St. Jones County.

On March 4, 1681, what had been the colony of New Sweden was formally partitioned into the colonies of Delaware and Pennsylvania. The border was established 12 miles north of New Castle, and the northern limit of Pennsylvania was set at 42 degrees north latitude. The eastern limit was the border with New Jersey at the Delaware River, while the western limit was undefined. In June 1681, Upland ceased to exist as the result of the reorganization of the Colony of Pennsylvania, with the Upland government becoming the government of Chester County, Pennsylvania.

On August 24, 1682, the Duke of York transferred the western Delaware River region to William Penn, including Delaware, thus transferring Deale County and St. Jones County from New York to Delaware. St. Jones County was renamed Kent County, Deale County was renamed Sussex County, and New Castle County retained its name.

Swedish explorer and botanist Pehr Kalm visited the descendants of the early Swedish immigrants to New Sweden in the mid-18th century and documented their experiences with the Native American Indians who resided in those parts, in a book entitled Travels into North America.

Significance and legacy

Historian H. Arnold Barton has suggested that the greatest significance of New Sweden was the strong and lasting interest in America that the colony generated in Sweden, although major Swedish immigration did not occur until the late 19th century. From 1870 to 1910, more than one million Swedes arrived in America, settling particularly in Minnesota and other states of the Upper Midwest.

Traces of New Sweden persist in the lower Delaware valley, including Holy Trinity Church in Wilmington, Delaware, Gloria Dei Church and St. James Kingsessing Church in Philadelphia, Trinity Episcopal Church in Swedesboro, New Jersey, and Christ Church in Swedesburg, Pennsylvania. All of those churches are commonly known as "Old Swedes' Church". Christiana, Delaware, is one of the few settlements in the area retaining a Swedish name, and Upland survives as Upland, Pennsylvania. Swedesford Road is still found in Chester and Montgomery Counties, Pennsylvania, although Swedesford has long since become Norristown. Swedeland, Pennsylvania, is part of Upper Merion Township in Montgomery County. The American Swedish Historical Museum in South Philadelphia houses many exhibits, documents, and artifacts from the New Sweden colony.

Perhaps the greatest contribution of New Sweden to the development of the New World is the log house building technique. The colonists of New Sweden brought with them the log cabin, which became such an icon of the American frontier that it is commonly thought of as an American structure. The C. A. Nothnagle Log House on Swedesboro-Paulsboro Road in Gibbstown, New Jersey, is one of the oldest surviving log houses in the United States.

Finnish influence
The settlers came from all over the Swedish realm. The percentage of Finns in New Sweden grew especially towards the end of the period of colonization. Finns composed 22 percent of the population during Swedish rule, and rose to about 50 percent after the colony came under Dutch rule. A contingent of 140 Finns arrived in 1664. The ship Mercurius sailed to the colony in 1665, and 92 of the 106 passengers were listed as Finns. Memory of the early Finnish settlement lived on in place names near the Delaware River such as Finland (Marcus Hook), Torne, Lapland, Finns Point, Mullica Hill, and Mullica River.

A portion of these Finns were known as Forest Finns, people of Finnish descent who had been living in the forest areas of Central Sweden. The Forest Finns had moved from Savonia in Eastern Finland to Dalarna, Bergslagen and other provinces in central Sweden during the late-16th to mid-17th century. Their relocation had started as part of an effort by Swedish King Gustav Vasa to expand agriculture to these uninhabited parts of the country. The Finns in Savonia traditionally farmed with a slash-and-burn method which was better suited to pioneering agriculture in vast forest areas. This was also the farming method used by the American Indians of Delaware.

Forts

Fort Christina (1638) – at the Brandywine Creek and Christina River in Wilmington, Delaware, later renamed Fort Altena (1655)
Fort Mecoponacka (1641) – in Chester, near Finlandia or Upland in Delaware County, Pennsylvania
Fort Nya Elfsborg (1643) – between present-day Salem Creek and Alloway Creek near Bridgeport, New Jersey
Fort Nya Gothenborg (1643) – on Tinicum Island near the site of The Printzhof in Essington, Delaware County, Pennsylvania
Fort Nya Vasa (1646) – at Kingsessing, on the eastern-side of Cobbs Creek in Philadelphia
Fort Nya Korsholm (1647) – on the Schuylkill River near the South River in Philadelphia
Fort Casimir (1654) – also known as Fort Trinity (in Swedish, Trefaldigheten), located at the end of Chestnut Street near Harmony & 2nd streets in New Castle, Delaware.

Permanent settlements
Christina (1638 and 1641; modern Wilmington, Delaware)
Finland, Finlandia, or Chamassungh (1641 and 1643; modern Marcus Hook, Pennsylvania)
Upland or Uppland (1641 and 1643; modern Chester, Pennsylvania)
Varkens Kill (1641; modern Salem County, New Jersey)
Printztorp (1643; modern Chester, Pa.)
Tequirassy (1643; modern Eddystone, Pennsylvania)
Tenakonk or Tinicum (1643; modern Tinicum Township, Delaware County, Pennsylvania)
Provins, Druweeÿland, or Manaiping (1643; modern southwest Philadelphia, on Province Island on the Schuylkill River)
Minquas or Minqua's Island (1644; modern southwest Philadelphia, Pennsylvania)
Kingsessing (1644; modern southwest Philadelphia, Pennsylvania)
Mölndal (1645; modern Yeadon, Pennsylvania)
Torne (1647; modern West Philadelphia)
Sveaborg (c. 1649; modern Swedesboro, New Jersey)
Nya Stockholm (c. 1649; modern Bridgeport, New Jersey)
Sidoland (1654; modern Wilmington, Del.)
Översidolandet (1654; modern Wilmington, Del.)
Timmerön or Timber Island (1654; modern Wilmington)
Strandviken (1654; modern Wilmington)
Ammansland (1654; modern Darby, Pennsylvania)

Rivers and creeks
 Delaware River: "South River" (Södre Rivier; as opposed to the Hudson), "Swedish River" (Swenskes Rivier), "New Sweden River" (Nya Sweriges Rivier)
 Schuylkill River: "Schuyl Creek" (Schuylen Kÿl) meaning hidden river
 Brandywine Creek: "Fish Creek" (Fiske Kÿl)
 Christina River: "Susquehanna" (Minquas) or "Christina Creek" (Christina Kÿl)
 Raccoon Creek: "Narraticon" (Lenape) meaning Raccoon
 Salem River: Varkens Kill (Hogg Creek)
 Mullica River, named for an early Finnish settler, Eric Pålsson Mullica

See also

C. A. Nothnagle Log House
Swedish emigration to North America
European colonization of the Americas
Possessions of Sweden
Swedish American
Upland Court
Finnish American
American Swedish Historical Museum
Rambo apple
Kalmar Nyckel
Laurentius Carels, Swedish American Lutheran pastor
Olof Persson Stille, first chief justice of the Upland Court
Wedge (border)
New Sweden Farmstead Museum
Old Swedes' Church
Lower Swedish Cabin
Flag of Philadelphia

References
Notes

Bibliography
 Barton, H. Arnold (1994). A Folk Divided: Homeland Swedes and Swedish Americans, 1840–1940. Uppsala: Acta Universitatis Upsaliensis
 Benson, Adolph B. and Naboth Hedin, eds. (1938) Swedes in America, 1638–1938. The Swedish American Tercentenary Association. New Haven, Connecticut: Yale University Press 
 Jennings, Francis, (1984) The Ambiguous Iroquois. New York: Norton 
 Johnson, Amandus (1927)  The Swedes on the Delaware. Philadelphia: International Printing Company
 
 Munroe, John A. (1977) Colonial Delaware. Wilmington, Delaware: Delaware Heritage Press
 Shorto, Russell (2004) The Island at the Center of the World. New York: Doubleday 
 Weslager, C. A. (1990) A Man and his Ship, Peter Minuet and the Kalmar Nyckel. Wilmington, Delaware: Kalmar Nyckel Foundation 
 Weslager, C. A. (1988) New Sweden on the Delaware 1638–1655. Wilmington, Delaware: Middle Atlantic Press 
 Weslager, C. A. (1987) The Swedes and Dutch at New Castle. Wilmington, Delaware: Middle Atlantic Press 

Further reading
 Jameson, J. Franklin (1887) Willem Usselinx: Founder of the Dutch and Swedish West India Companies. New York: G.P. Putnam's Sons.
 Mickley, Joseph J. (1881) Some Account of William Usselinx and Peter Minuit: Two individuals who were instrumental in establishing the first permanent colony in Delaware. The Historical Society of Delaware.
 Myers, Albert Cook, ed. (1912) Narratives of Early Pennsylvania, West New Jersey, and Delaware, 1630–1707. New York: Charles Scribner's Sons
 Ward, Christopher (1930) Dutch and Swedes on the Delaware, 1609–1664. Philadelphia: University of Pennsylvania Press

External links

The Finns in American Colonial History
The American Swedish Historical Museum
A Brief History of New Sweden in America, at The Swedish Colonial Society
The New Sweden Centre – museum, tours and reenactors
New Sweden at the FamilySearch Research Wiki
Johnson's detailed map of New Sweden
350th Anniversary of the Landing of the Swedes and Finns in Delaware

 
Colonization history of the United States
Colonial settlements in North America
Former Swedish colonies
17th century in Sweden
Economic history of Sweden
History of Philadelphia
Wilmington, Delaware
States and territories established in 1638
Finnish-American history
Swedish-American history
European colonization of North America
Former colonies in North America
1638 establishments in North America
1655 disestablishments in North America
1655 disestablishments in the Swedish colonial empire
1638 establishments in the Swedish colonial empire
States and territories disestablished in 1655